Carl Anderson may refer to:

Arts and entertainment
Carl Thomas Anderson (1865–1948), American cartoonist
Carl Anderson (art director) (1903–1989), American art director
Carl Anderson (singer) (1945–2004), American singer, film and theatre actor

Politics and law
Carl C. Anderson (1877–1912), American politician, U.S. Representative from Ohio
Carl Anderson (North Dakota politician) (1897–1945), American politician, North Dakota State Treasurer
Carl Anderson (South Carolina politician) (born 1961), American politician, member of the South Carolina House of Representatives

Sports
Carl Anderson (American football) (1898–1978), American college football coach
Carl Anderson (basketball) (1913–2001), American professional basketball player
Carl Anderson (cricketer) (born 1977), New Zealand cricketer

Others
Carl David Anderson (1905–1991), American physicist, Nobel laureate
Carl A. Anderson (born 1951), American Supreme Knight of the Knights of Columbus
Carl Anderson (Toronto official), Canadian educator and politician, candidate in 1974 Toronto municipal election

See also
Carl Andersen (disambiguation)
Karl Anderson (disambiguation)